Bacon's College is a co-educational secondary school and sixth form located in Rotherhithe, London, England. It was previously a City Technology College, but officially changed to academy status in 2007.

History

Founded in 1703 by Josiah Bacon, a fellmonger, its first location was above the porch of St Mary Magdalen, Bermondsey, as Bacon's School. It was relocated to nearby Grange Road in 1860 and was subsequently relocated in 1962 to Pages Walk as a mixed secondary modern school. As part of the development of Docklands area of Rotherhithe it became a CTC in a new campus. The college enjoyed its tercentenary in 2003, and held a Founder's Day service in St Paul's Cathedral to celebrate the event. Normally its Founder's Day service is held at Southwark Cathedral.

Bacon's College opened on its current Rotherhithe site in 1991, moving from its old building in Bermondsey. Bacon's College is a 11–19 Church of England school sponsored by United Learning. The College opened in 1991 in the heart of London Docklands with a new building. Every year 180 students are admitted into the Academy.

Students of Bacon's College can use Bacon's College Community Centre, which includes a third generation astroturf football pitch, outdoor netball and tennis courts, indoor cricket nets, and a sports hall. The centre is available for private hire for weddings and conferences.

Notable former pupils

 David Amoo, footballer who plays for Port Vale.
 Madeline Duggan, actress who played Lauren Branning on the BBC1 soap EastEnders
 Jade Goody, Big Brother contestant
 William Henry Gray, known as W. H. Gray (1808–1896), pioneer settler of South Australia.
 Blake Harrison, actor who played Neil Sutherland in the E4 comedy The Inbetweeners
 David Haye, boxer
 Thomas Hicks, better known as Tommy Steele, singer and actor. Attended in the 1950s when the school was in Grange Road.
 Ashley John-Baptiste, BBC broadcast journalist and presenter
 Billy Mehmet, professional footballer who has represented the Republic of Ireland
 Roland Manookian, actor whose works include The Football Factory, Goodbye Charlie Bright, and The Business
 Frank Nouble, footballer who plays for Tianjin Songjiang
 Ben Watson, Charlton Athletic footballer

Sources 
 official website
 https://web.archive.org/web/20040728062319/http://www.dfes.gov.uk/cgi-bin/performancetables/dfe1x1_02.pl?Code=&Mode=Z&School=2106900
 https://web.archive.org/web/20090226190749/http://www.baconsmediacentre.co.uk/
https://web.archive.org/web/20160304061313/http://www.baconscollege.co.uk/Assets/Uploaded/BaconsCollegeProspectus.pdf

Former city technology colleges
Academies in the London Borough of Southwark
Educational institutions established in 1703
1703 establishments in England
Secondary schools in the London Borough of Southwark
Church of England secondary schools in the Diocese of Southwark
United Learning schools